The 2011 Goody's Fast Relief 500 was a NASCAR Sprint Cup Series stock car race that was held on April 3, 2011 at Martinsville Speedway in Martinsville, Virginia. Contested over 500 laps, it was the sixth race of the 2011 season. Kevin Harvick from the Richard Childress Racing team won the race, while Dale Earnhardt Jr. finished in the second position ahead of Kyle Busch. Scenes from this particular race are shown in The Simpsons episode "Steal This Episode".

Report

Background

Martinsville Speedway is one of five short tracks to hold NASCAR races. The track's turns are banked at eleven degrees, while the front stretch, the location of the finish line, is banked at zero degrees. The back stretch also has a zero degree banking. The racetrack had seats for 63,000 spectators.

Before the race, Carl Edwards led the Drivers' Championship with 187 points, and Ryan Newman stood in second with 178. Kurt Busch followed in third with 177 points, one ahead of Kyle Busch and four ahead of Jimmie Johnson in fourth and fifth. Tony Stewart with 170 was six points ahead of Paul Menard, as Juan Pablo Montoya with 161 points, was four ahead of Kevin Harvick and Matt Kenseth in ninth and tenth. In the Manufacturers' Championship, Toyota, Chevrolet and Ford were in the first three positions with 31 points, 14 ahead of Dodge in fourth. Denny Hamlin was the race's defending champion after winning it in 2010.

Practice and qualifying
Two practice sessions were held in preparation for the race; both on Friday. The first session lasted 80 minutes long, while the second was 90 minutes long. Kyle Busch was quickest with a time of 19.804 seconds in the first session, 0.001 seconds faster than Joey Logano. Harvick was just off Logano's pace, followed by Brad Keselowski, Jamie McMurray, and Jeff Burton. Menard was seventh, still within a second of Busch's time. Also in the first practice session, Johnson spun sideways after the second turn.

In the second and final practice, David Ragan was quickest with a time of 19.670 seconds. Jeff Gordon followed in second, ahead of Keselowski and David Reutimann. Kasey Kahne was fifth quickest, with a time of 19.764 seconds. Ryan Newman, Bobby Labonte, Marcos Ambrose, Brian Vickers, and A. J. Allmendinger rounded out the first ten positions. Kyle Busch, who was first in the first session, could only manage 23rd. The second session also had cautions because of spins. The drivers involved were Logano and Dennis Setzer.

Forty-four cars are entered for qualifying, but only forty-three could qualify for the race because of NASCAR's qualifying procedure. McMurray clinched his first pole position of the season, with a time of 19.621 seconds. He was joined on the front row of the grid by Newman. Kasey Kahne qualified third, Logano took fourth, and Hamlin started fifth. Allmendinger, Labonte, Reutimann, Harvick and Regan Smith rounded out the top ten. However, in the qualifying session, only 43 cars attempted to qualify (Setzer and Derrike Cope withdrew). Following the session, McMurray commented, "We've had really good cars. It just seems like we've had really bad luck, so I'm hoping. ... I've always been a little superstitious of green, and I showed up, and I saw my car, and I was like, 'Wow, that's not really what I was expecting to see.' But I hope this turns it around for us."

Results

Qualifying

Race

Standings after the race

Drivers' Championship standings

Manufacturers' Championship standings

Note: Only the top five positions are included for the Drivers' Championship.

References

Goody's Fast Relief 500
Goody's Fast Relief 500
NASCAR races at Martinsville Speedway
April 2011 sports events in the United States